The National Domestic Workers Alliance is an advocacy organization promoting the rights of domestic workers in the United States. Founded in 2007, it is made up of 4 local chapters and 63 affiliate organizations around the country, along with thousands of individual members. Their work advocates for low-income laborers in the context of broader social justice issues, including immigration reform, domestic violence, and more recently the #MeToo movement and the COVID-19 pandemic. 

There are two million domestic workers in the US, most of whom are immigrants and women of color. They are a very diverse and largely overlooked group, and most make less than 13 dollars an hour.

The NDWA advocates for a Domestic Workers' Bill of Rights, including overtime pay, one day off per week, and protection under state human rights laws. A version of this bill of rights was passed in New York in 2010 thanks to the NDWA's advocacy, and similar legislation has recently been introduced in California.

Ai-jen Poo is the president and Jenn Stowe is the executive director of the National Domestic Workers Alliance.  Poo was born in Pittsburgh, Pennsylvania. Her mother was a PhD student, so she was raised largely by the women in her community. When Poo was studying at Columbia, she started volunteering with the Committee Against Anti-Asian Violence, which is where she became aware of the overlooked needs of domestic workers.

In 2014, she was awarded a MacArthur fellowship, "a five-year grant given to the nation’s most exceptionally creative individuals, to fund her vibrant, worker-led movement to transform the working conditions and labor standards for private-household workers."

Alicia Garza, who co-founded the Black Lives Matter network, is the Director of Strategy and Partnerships at the National Domestic Workers Alliance.

References

Workers' rights organizations based in the United States
Advocacy groups in the United States
American domestic workers
Non-profit organizations based in the United States
Domestic workers' unions
Labor rights groups
2007 establishments in the United States
Organizations established in 2007